Mervil Larson (born November 9, 1940) is an American sprint canoer who competed in the late 1960s. He was eliminated in the repechages of the K-4 1000 m event at the 1968 Summer Olympics in Mexico City.

References
Sports-reference.com profile

External links

1940 births
American male canoeists
Canoeists at the 1968 Summer Olympics
Living people
Olympic canoeists of the United States
Place of birth missing (living people)